Lamiya Abed Khadawi (died 27 April 2005) was an Iraqi politician and member of parliament. She was shot dead on her doorstep in Baghdad on 27 April 2005, the first MP killed since the January elections.

Career
Khadawi was a member of Iraq's National Assembly. She was elected to the parliament in the general elections held in January 2005. She was also part of the former Iraqi prime minister Iyad Allawi's List Party.

References

Year of birth missing
2005 deaths
21st-century Iraqi women politicians
21st-century Iraqi politicians
Assassinated Iraqi politicians
Deaths by firearm in Iraq
People murdered in Iraq
Members of the Council of Representatives of Iraq
2005 murders in Iraq